A cocktail skewer or cocktail stick is a short cylindrical stick, made of wood, that has a somewhat sharp point on both ends.  It is usually used as a skewer for holding decorations (such as cherries) in cocktails and also for serving food such as amuse-bouches at cocktail parties.

Injuries 
Ingestion of cocktail sticks, or fragments of them, has been known to cause injuries in several parts of the alimentary canal.

See also 
 Champagne stirrer
 Cocktail umbrella
 Swizzle stick
 Toothpick

References

External links 

 

Cocktail garnishes
Food preparation utensils